Mikhail Gennadiyevich Dmitriyev is a Soviet and Russian  mathematician. He was the President of the University of Pereslavl from 1995-1998. Currently he is a professor of the National Research University – Higher School of Economics

He holds a Doctor of Physical and Mathematical Sciences degree (1984), he is a specialist in applied mathematics and computer science. He has earned the "Honored Worker of Higher Professional Education of Russia" in 2008, and is a member of the Russian Academy of Natural Sciences.

Notable work
He holds patent in Russia under number 2426226 (issued 11/01/2010) describing quantum frequency standards used to stabilize the frequency of masers.

References

External links
WorldCat listing
MathNet Listing

Russian mathematicians
Academic staff of the Higher School of Economics
Living people
Year of birth missing (living people)
Soviet mathematicians